Harold Huntley Bassett (April 1, 1907 – October 4, 2007) was a major general in the United States Air Force.

Early life
Harold Huntley Bassett was born in April 1907 in Albion, Illinois. He would attend St. John's Military Academy in Delafield, Wisconsin, and the California Institute of Technology.

Career
Bassett graduated from the United States Military Academy in 1929. First he was assigned to the Corps of Engineers before transferring to the Air Corps. During World War II he served in the Air Weather Service. Later he was given command of the U.S. Air Force Security Service and the United States Taiwan Defense Command. In 1958 he was given command of the Air Weather Service. His retirement was effective as of October 1, 1959.

Awards he received include the Legion of Merit with oak leaf cluster, the Distinguished Flying Cross, and the Bronze Star Medal.

Death
Bassett died on October 4, 2007.

References

People from Albion, Illinois
United States Air Force generals
Recipients of the Legion of Merit
Recipients of the Distinguished Flying Cross (United States)
United States Army personnel of World War II
United States Military Academy alumni
California Institute of Technology alumni
1907 births
2007 deaths
American centenarians
Men centenarians
Military personnel from Illinois